Cicadettana texana is a species of cicada in the family Cicadidae. The species was formerly a member of the genus Cicadetta.

References

Further reading
 

Articles created by Qbugbot
Insects described in 1936
Cicadettini